Expeditie Robinson: 2000, was the first Dutch/Belgian version of the Swedish show Expedition Robinson, or  Survivor as it is referred to in some countries. This season began airing on September 15, 2000 and concluded on December 18, 2000. This season saw the first ever pan regional version of Expedition Robinson in the world. Keeping with the traditions of Robinson, the two teams for this season were the North team (Noord) and the South team (Zuid). Ultimately, it was Karin Lindenhovius from the Netherlands who won the season over Eva Willems from Belgium with a jury vote of 5-3.

Finishing order

Future Appearances
Veronique Pryker, Melvin Pigot and Karin Lindenhovius returned to compete in Expeditie Robinson: Battle of the Titans.

Voting history

 In episode eleven, Sascha won a reward challenge and as part of her reward she was granted a second vote at the eleventh tribal council.

External links
http://worldofbigbrother.com/Survivor/BN/1/about.shtml

Expeditie Robinson seasons
2000 Dutch television seasons
2000 Belgian television seasons